Brooksby is an unincorporated community in Saskatchewan.

Unincorporated communities in Saskatchewan
Willow Creek No. 458, Saskatchewan